Probable global transcription activator SNF2L2 is a protein that in humans is encoded by the SMARCA2 gene.

Function 

The protein encoded by this gene is a member of the SWI/SNF family of proteins and is highly similar to the brahma protein of Drosophila. Members of this family have helicase and ATPase activities and are thought to regulate transcription of certain genes by altering the chromatin structure around those genes. The encoded protein is part of the large ATP-dependent chromatin remodeling complex SNF/SWI, which is required for transcriptional activation of genes normally repressed by chromatin. Two transcript variants encoding different isoforms have been found for this gene, which contains a trinucleotide repeat (CAG) length polymorphism.

Interactions 

SMARCA2 has been shown to interact with:

 ACTL6A, 
 ARID1B,
 CEBPB, 
 POLR2A, 
 Prohibitin, 
 SIN3A, 
 SMARCB1, 
 SMARCC1,  and
 SS18. 
- Nicolaides Baraitser Syndrome (NCBRS)

References

Further reading